Danny Phillip Dietz Jr. (January 26, 1980 – June 28, 2005) was a Navy SEAL who was awarded the U.S. Navy's second highest decoration, the Navy Cross, along with the Purple Heart, for his actions during the War in Afghanistan.

Early life and education
Dietz was born on January 26, 1980, in Aurora, Colorado to parents Cindy and Daniel P. Dietz Sr. He was of Apache ancestry. He graduated from Heritage High School in Littleton in 1999.

Career

Dietz joined the Navy on August 31, 1999, and following his graduation from basic training at the Recruit Training Command, Great Lakes, Illinois, he finished Gunner's Mate "A" School also at Great Lakes. From that point on, he enrolled in Basic Underwater Demolition/SEAL training (BUD/S) and graduated with Class 232 in 2001. Dietz proceeded to the Basic Airborne Course at Fort Benning in Georgia, after which he completed SEAL Qualification Training and SEAL Delivery Vehicle Training.
Shortly after checking in at SEAL Delivery Vehicle Team 2 in Virginia Beach, Virginia, on November 8, 2001, he was appointed to Task Unit Bravo as the optional SDV pilot and the ordnance and engineering department head. In April 2005, Dietz was deployed with his Special Reconnaissance component to Afghanistan to help Naval Special Warfare Squadron TEN in the indictment of the Global War on Terrorism.

Operation Red Wings

Operation Red Wings was a counter-insurgency operation by the United States Armed Forces to kill or capture Ahmad Shah, (code name Ben Sharmak), a known terrorist and head of the militia, "Mountain Tigers". The operation was carried out, on 27 June 2005, by Navy SEAL Team TEN; the four-man team was made up of 2nd Class Matthew G. Axelson and 2nd Class Marcus Luttrell supporting the role of snipers while 2nd Class Danny P. Dietz and team leader Navy Lieutenant Michael P. Murphy were spotters.

The mission was compromised after goat herders stumbled upon the SEALs and reported them to the Taliban after the SEALs let them go free. An intense firefight ensued after the SEALs were ambushed by Taliban insurgents who outnumbered them twenty-five to one. Murphy went into an open clearing to get reception and call for support, he managed to reach the base, giving them the SEALs location as well as the number of enemies. Exposed to enemy fire, he was shot in the back while making the call, it was this act that awarded Murphy the Medal Of Honor posthumously. Murphy then returned to his team to continue the battle. Low on ammunitions, Murphy, Axelson and Danny Dietz were killed while Luttrell was knocked unconscious by an RPG.

The support dispatched was a team of eight Navy SEALs and eight 160th SOAR Army Night Stalkers. However, all sixteen special forces soldiers aboard the helicopter perished, when the CH-47 Chinook was hit by a rocket-propelled grenade that ignited the fuel tanks just as the soldiers were about to fast rope. Among the dead aboard the helicopter were Lieutenant Commander Erik S. Kristensen, the highest-ranking officer to die in the operation, and Kip A. Jacoby, the youngest soldier to die in the operation, at the age of 21.

SEAL Marcus Luttrell was the sole survivor of SEAL Team TEN, aided by an Afghan villager who sheltered him, he was rescued by green berets six days later. Danny Dietz, Matthew Axelson and Michael Murphy were declared killed in action after their bodies were recovered on 4 July.

Death
Dietz was mortally wounded after taking the brunt of the initial attack and while evading he stumbled and injured his ankle. This led him to lose his ability to walk and as a result,  Luttrell carried him on their way down the mountain, as Dietz fired back. This rigorous activity was repeated several times until Luttrell accidentally swung him into a bullet, when Luttrell was about to fall. The bullet penetrated the back of his head and instantly killed him, Dietz's dead weight came as a surprise to Luttrell and as a result, he fell down the edge of the mountain with Dietz's body and was severely injured.

Dietz's body was found by a group of U.S. Air Force pararescuemen during a search and rescue operation, on 4 July 2005, and returned to the United States. Dietz was buried with full military honors at Fort Logan National Cemetery in Denver, Colorado.

Personal life
Dietz has a brother Eric and a sister Tiffany.

Dietz was known to show appreciation towards the outdoors and he enjoyed fishing and rock climbing. He had a black belt in Taekwondo from the Korean Academy of Taekwondo.

Awards and decorations

Navy Cross

On September 13, 2006, Dietz was posthumously awarded the Navy Cross by Navy Secretary Donald C. Winter.

Citation

For extraordinary heroism in actions against the enemy while serving in a four-man Special Reconnaissance element with SEAL Delivery Vehicle Team ONE, Naval Special Warfare Task unit, Afghanistan from 27 to 28 June 2005. Petty Officer Dietz demonstrated extraordinary heroism in the face of grave danger in the vicinity of Asadabad, Kunar Province, Afghanistan. Operating in the middle of an enemy-controlled area, in extremely rugged terrain, his Special Reconnaissance element was tasked with locating a high-level Anti-Coalition Militia leader, in support of a follow-on direct action mission to disrupt enemy activity. On 28 June 2005, the element was spotted by Anti-Coalition Militia sympathizers, who immediately revealed their position to the militia fighters. As a result, the element directly encountered the enemy. Demonstrating exceptional resolve and fully understanding the gravity of the situation and his responsibility to his teammates, Petty Officer Dietz fought valiantly against the numerically superior and positionally advantaged enemy force. Remaining behind in a hailstorm of enemy fire, Petty Officer Dietz was wounded by enemy fire. Despite his injuries, he bravely fought on, valiantly defending his teammates and himself in a harrowing gunfight, until he was mortally wounded. By his undaunted courage in the face of heavy enemy fire, and absolute devotion to his teammates, Petty Officer Dietz will long be remembered for the role he played in the Global War on Terrorism. Petty Officer Dietz' courageous and selfless heroism, exceptional professional skill, and utmost devotion to duty reflected great credit upon him and were in keeping with the highest traditions of the United States Naval Service. He gallantly gave his life for the cause of freedom.

Legacy
 
On July 4, 2007, the town of Littleton, Colorado erected a bronze lifesize statue of Dietz holding his rifle in a 'parade-rest' position on one knee. It contained the same statement on the Navy Cross citation.

On August 18, 2009, the span of South Santa Fe Drive between Interstate 25 and Colorado State Highway 470 was named Navy SEAL Danny Dietz Memorial Highway in his honour.

Starting in 2010, the Danny Dietz Memorial Day Classic is a fundraiser / rodeo event held the weekend of Memorial Day at the Fort Bend County Fairgrounds in Rosenberg, Texas.

For the 2013 film Lone Survivor, which covered the events of Operation Red Wings, Dietz was portrayed by actor Emile Hirsch.

See also

List of people from Littleton, Colorado

Further reading

References

1980 births
2005 deaths
United States Navy SEALs personnel
Recipients of the Navy Cross (United States)
People from Aurora, Colorado
Military personnel from Colorado
American military personnel killed in the War in Afghanistan (2001–2021)
United States Navy personnel of the War in Afghanistan (2001–2021)
Burials at Fort Logan National Cemetery
United States Navy non-commissioned officers